The 1985 Midwestern City Conference men's basketball tournament (now known as the Horizon League men's basketball tournament) was held March 7–9 at Mabee Center in Tulsa, Oklahoma.

Loyola–Chicago defeated  in the championship game, 89–83, to win their first MCC/Horizon League men's basketball tournament.

The Ramblers received an automatic bid to the 1985 NCAA tournament as the #4 seed in the East region, and advanced to the Sweet 16.

Format
All eight conference members participated in the tournament and were seeded based on regular season conference records.

Bracket

References

Horizon League men's basketball tournament
Tournament
Midwestern City Conference men's basketball tournament
Midwestern City Conference men's basketball tournament